KVBL 103.1 FM is a radio station licensed to Union, Oregon.  The station broadcasts a News-Talk format and is owned by KVBL, LLC.

References

External links
KVBL's website

VBL
News and talk radio stations in the United States
Union County, Oregon